J. Eshelman and Company Store, also known as The Square Deal Store, is a historic general store located at Clarence Center in Erie County, New York. It is a three-story, brick and cast iron commercial building constructed in the Italianate style in 1872.  It exemplifies the type of brick and cast iron commercial building common to the region from the 1850s to the 1880s.

It was listed on the National Register of Historic Places in 1982.

References

External links
Eshelman, J., and Company Store - U.S. National Register of Historic Places on Waymarking.com

Commercial buildings on the National Register of Historic Places in New York (state)
Italianate architecture in New York (state)
Commercial buildings completed in 1872
Buildings and structures in Erie County, New York
National Register of Historic Places in Erie County, New York